This is a season-by-season list of records compiled by Denver in men's ice hockey.

Denver has won nine NCAA Men's Division I Ice Hockey Championships in its history, tying them with  Michigan for the most ever. Their most recent national championship was in 2022. Denver won the first three NCAA tournaments they participated in (an NCAA record) as well as winning their first seven NCAA tournament games (also a record).

Season-by-season results

Note: GP = Games played, W = Wins, L = Losses, T = Ties

* Winning percentage is used when conference schedules are unbalanced.† Denver's participation in the 1973 NCAA tournament was later vacated due to recruiting violations.bold and italic are program records

Footnotes

References

 
Lists of college men's ice hockey seasons in the United States
Denver Pioneers ice hockey season